St. Nicholas Croatian Church is a Roman Catholic church in Millvale, Pennsylvania, USA within the Diocese of Pittsburgh. It is listed on the National Register of Historic Places. It is noted for its murals by Maxo Vanka, painted in 1937 and 1941, such as Immigrant Mother Raises Her Sons for American Industry and The Capitalist. Time in 1937 described the murals as "one of the few distinguished sets of church murals in the U. S."

St. Nicholas remains an active parish church in the Diocese of Pittsburgh as of 2022. In 2019 it was reorganized as a personal (non-territorial) parish within the Shrines of Pittsburgh, a grouping of six churches with unique histories which the diocese hoped to promote as pilgrimage and visitor destinations.

History
The church was established in 1900 following an acrimonious split from the similarly named St. Nicholas Croatian Church about  downriver on East Ohio Street in Troy Hill. The cornerstone was laid for the new church in July 1900 and it was completed in November of the same year. The building was designed in the Romanesque Revival style by Pittsburgh architect Frederick C. Sauer and cost about $34,000 in total. Andrew Carnegie donated a pipe organ which was installed in 1902.

In 1921, the church burned down, believed to be the result of arson. Sauer was again contracted to prepare plans for a replacement church, which was basically a pared-down version of his original design. This current church building was dedicated on May 30, 1922.

After the rebuilding of the church, the parish had a debt of almost $100,000. The pastor of the other St. Nicholas parish in Troy Hill, Albert Zagar, had been successful in clearing the debt there, so in 1931 he was transferred to St. Nicholas in Millvale. By 1937, he had paid off most of the debt and decided to put some money toward decorating the church. Seeking an artist who would understand the cultural background of the parish, he approached the well connected Slovene-American writer Louis Adamic, who recommended his friend Maksimilijan "Maxo" Vanka. Vanka, a former professor at the Academy of Fine Arts, University of Zagreb, had struggled to find work since immigrating to the United States and happily accepted the commission to create murals for the church.

Vanka painted the first set of murals from April to June, 1937, working every day until 2 or 3 in the morning. During this time, he became convinced that the church was haunted by a ghostly, black-robed figure, which Adamic later wrote about in a piece for Harper's Magazine titled The Millvale Apparition. Nevertheless, he completed the murals on schedule. Although Vanka had "upset tradition in his introduction of labor scenes... within the sacred precincts of a church", the murals were met with acclaim from the press as well as church officials. As a result, Vanka was invited back to complete a second set of murals in 1941.

The later murals were dedicated on November 16, 1941. With World War II then raging in Europe, these murals featured much more overtly anti-war subject matter than the earlier ones. With the completion of the full set of murals, the Pittsburgh Press wrote that the artwork would "put [the church] near the top of the 'must list' of places to see in the Pittsburgh district", while the Sun-Telegraph wrote that Vanka and Zagar were "tossing the dogmas of religious art into the ash-can". Vanka himself described the murals as "my contribution to America".

Murals
Vanka painted the first set of murals in 1937 and added the rest in 1941. The subject matter of the murals includes a combination of traditional religious imagery and social themes related to the Croatian American experience, such as war, injustice, and exploitation of workers.

The apse and ceiling vaults are decorated in the Byzantine tradition, with an image of Mary, Queen of Heaven, above the altar and depictions of the Ascension of Jesus and the Four Evangelists on the ceiling. Elsewhere, Vanka included scenes from the Old and New Testaments, images of saints, and scenes depicting the Croatian immigrant experience such as Immigrant Mother Raises Her Sons for American Industry, in which a group of Croatian women mourn over a young man killed in a mining accident. Other murals include allegorical depictions of injustice and inequality in America, such as The American Capitalist, in which a wealthy businessman sits before an elaborate meal while ignoring a beggar, and Injustice, which depicts a hooded figure wearing a gas mask and holding a scale in which a loaf of bread is outweighed by gold. Vanka also included strong anti-war imagery, such as a crucified Jesus being pierced by a World War I soldier's bayonet, and the Virgin Mary breaking a soldier's rifle.

An additional mural behind the altar was created by a different artist, Joko Knezevich, in 1970.

The Society to Preserve the Millvale Murals of Maxo Vanka conducts guided tours of the murals on a regular basis.

See also
National Register of Historic Places listings in Allegheny County, Pennsylvania

References

External links
 
 St. Nicholas Croatian Catholic Parish Official site
 The Millvale Murals of Maxo Vanka Official site, Vanka Murals

Roman Catholic churches in Pennsylvania
Roman Catholic Diocese of Pittsburgh
Pittsburgh History & Landmarks Foundation Historic Landmarks
History of labor relations in the United States
Churches in Allegheny County, Pennsylvania
Croatian-American culture in Pennsylvania
Croatian-American history
Roman Catholic churches completed in 1922
National Register of Historic Places in Allegheny County, Pennsylvania
20th-century Roman Catholic church buildings in the United States